District 19 of the Oregon State Senate comprises parts of Clackamas, Multnomah, and Washington counties. It is currently represented by Democrat Rob Wagner of Lake Oswego.

Election results 
District boundaries have changed over time, therefore, senators before 2013 may not represent the same constituency as today. From 1993 until 2003, the district covered parts of the central Willamette Valley, and from 2003 until 2013 it covered a slightly different area in the Portland metropolitan area.

References 

19
Clackamas County, Oregon
Multnomah County, Oregon
Washington County, Oregon